Fly is the fifth studio album by American country music band Dixie Chicks, released in 1999. The album was very successful for the group, debuting at number one on the Billboard 200.  It has received diamond status by the RIAA on June 25, 2002, in the United States, for shipments of 10 million units.

The tracks "Ready to Run", "Cowboy Take Me Away", "Without You", "Goodbye Earl", "Cold Day in July", "Heartbreak Town", "Some Days You Gotta Dance" and "If I Fall You're Going Down with Me" were all released as singles; "Sin Wagon" also charted without officially being released. "Some Days You Gotta Dance" was previously recorded by The Ranch, a short-lived country trio founded by Keith Urban in the late 1990s. Urban plays guitar on the Dixie Chicks' rendition.

The album earned four Grammy nominations in 2000, and the group won two: Best Country Performance by a Duo or Group with Vocal for Ready to Run and Best Country Album. It was also nominated for Album of the Year and the writers of Ready to Run, Marcus Hummon and Martie Seidel were nominated for Best Country Song. In 2020, the album was ranked at 224 on Rolling Stone's 500 Greatest Albums of All Time list.

Track listing

Note
Track 13 is unlisted on the back cover and disc, though it is listed as "Ain't No Thang But a Chicken Wang" in the booklet. On some pressings of the CD, "Heartbreak Town" lasts 3:47 on track 12 and fades into track 13, which plays the last six seconds of the song. On other pressings of the CD, track 12 lasts for the full 3:53 seconds, and track 13 contains no audio, only lasting for 0:01. Digital versions of the album remove the blank track completely, bumping "Let Him Fly" up to track 13.

Personnel
Compiled from liner notes.

Dixie Chicks
 Natalie Maines – lead vocals, background vocals, handclapping
 Emily Robison – acoustic guitar, banjo, background vocals, dobro, handclapping, lap steel guitar
 Martie Seidel – fiddle, viola, background vocals

String section on "Without You"
Strings conducted and arranged by Dennis Burnside.
 Violins – Martie Seidel, Carl Gorodetsky, Pamela Sixfin, Lee Larrison, Connie Ellisor, Alan Umstead, David Davidson, Mary Katherine Van Osdale, David Angell, Janet Askey, Karen Winkelman, Cate Myer, Catherine Umstead
 Violas – Kris Wilkinson, Jim Grosjean, Gary Van Osdale, Monisa Angell
 Cellos – Bob Mason, John Catchings

Additional musicians

 Pat Buchanan – electric guitar
 Blake Chancey – handclapping
 Steve Conn – accordion
 Mike Henderson – electric guitar on "Hole in My Head"
 Marcus Hummon – acoustic guitar on "Ready to Run"
 Dennis Linde – acoustic guitar on "Goodbye Earl"
 Lloyd Maines – steel guitar
 George Marinelli – electric guitar on "Cold Day in July" & "Hello Mr. Heartache"
 Bob Mason – cello
 Terry McMillan – percussion
 John Mock – concertina, bodhrán, tin whistle
 Greg Morrow – drums
 Steve Nathan – Hammond B-3 organ, keyboards
 Michael Rhodes – bass guitar
 Tom Roady – percussion
 Charlie Robison – handclapping
 Matt Rollings – Hammond B-3 organ, keyboards
 Randy Scruggs – acoustic guitar
 Adam Steinberg – acoustic guitar on "Let Him Fly" & "Without You"
 Bryan Sutton – acoustic guitar on "Sin Wagon"
 Keith Urban – electric guitar on "Some Days You Gotta Dance"
 Billy Joe Walker Jr. – acoustic guitar on "Ready to Run" & Without You"
 Paul Worley – acoustic guitar, background vocals
"Iffy harmony" vocals on "Goodbye Earl" performed by the "Do-Wrongs": Blake Chancey, Paul Worley, Charlie Robison.

Production

 Producers: Blake Chancey, Paul Worley
 Engineers: Tony Castle, Mark Martin, Chris Rowe, Clarke Schleicher, Billy Sherrill
 Assistant engineer: Tony Castle
 Mixing: John Guess, Patrick Murphy
 Mastering: Denny Purcell
 Assistant mastering engineer: Jonathan Russell
 Editing: Tony Castle
 Art direction: Tracy Baskette-Fleaner, Bill Johnson
 Design: Gina R. Binkley
 Photography: Ed Rode, Albert Sanchez
 Photo consultant: Dari Marder
 Stylist: Renee Fowler
 Hair stylists: Jennifer Davis, Alex Dizon, Daniel Erdman, Melanie Shelley, Michael Silva
 Make-up: Debra Ferullo, Stacey Martin, Maital Sabbon
Cover lettering from Butterfly Alphabet by Kjell Bloch Sandved.

Charts and certifications

Weekly charts

Year-end charts

Certifications

Accolades
Grammy Awards

See also
List of best-selling albums in the United States

References

1999 albums
Albums produced by Paul Worley
The Chicks albums
Monument Records albums
Albums produced by Blake Chancey
Grammy Award for Best Country Album
Canadian Country Music Association Top Selling Album albums